The Pascagoula (also Pascoboula, Pacha-Ogoula, Pascagola, Pascaboula, Paskaguna) were an indigenous group living in coastal Mississippi on the Pascagoula River.

The name Pascagoula is a Mobilian Jargon term meaning "bread people". Choctaw native Americans using the name Pascagoula are named after the words for "bread nation". The Biloxi called them Pascoboula.

History
Pierre Le Moyne d'Iberville encountered the tribe in 1699 and was impressed by the beauty of Pascagoula women.
According to local Euro-American legend, the peace-loving tribe walked single file into the Singing River (now known as the Pascagoula River) because the local Biloxi tribe were planning to attack. Anola, a Biloxi "princess", eloped with the Pascagoula chief Altama, although she was engaged to a Biloxi chieftain. Anola's angry would-be husband led his soldiers into battle with the Pascagoula. Outnumbered and fearing enslavement by the Biloxi, the tribe joined hands and walked into the river singing a death song. The river became known as the "Singing River" because of this death song, which reportedly can still be heard at night.

Language

John Sibley reported that they spoke their own language which was different from neighboring languages in addition to Mobilian Jargon. Their language is undocumented.

References

External links
 Pascagoula Indian Tribe History
 Pascagoula Indians

Bibliography

 Goddard, Ives (2005). The indigenous languages of the Southeast. Anthropological Linguistics. 47 (1): 1–60.
 Higginbotham, Jay (Trans., Ed.). (1969). The journal of Sauvole. Mobile: Colonial Books.
 McWilliams, Richebourg G. (Ed., Trans.). (1981). Iberville's gulf journals. University: University of Alabama Press.
 Le Page du Pratz, Antoine Simon. (1758). Histoire de la Louisiana (Vols. 1-3). Paris: De Bure.
 Sibley, John. (1806). Historical sketches of the several Indian tribes in Louisiana, south of the Arkansas River, and between the Mississippi and River Grand. In T. Jefferson (Ed.), Message from the President of the United States communicating the discoveries made in exploring the Missouri, Red River, and Washita (pp. 48–62). New York: G. F. Hopkins.

Native American tribes in Mississippi
Unclassified languages of North America